Petra Maria Mede (born 7 March 1970) is a Swedish comedian, dancer, actress and television presenter. She was born in Stockholm, and grew up in Gothenburg. Mede is known for her several roles in comic shows and as a television presenter.

Career

In 2009, she hosted Melodifestivalen 2009, where the Swedish entry for the Eurovision Song Contest 2009 was chosen and was voted Sweden's best female comedian the same year.

In May 2013, Petra hosted the Eurovision Song Contest 2013 in Malmö, Sweden after Loreen's win in Baku in the previous year's competition. Her performance was widely acclaimed by TV critics and journalists around Europe and she performed an interval act during the Grand Final. She was the first solo presenter in nearly 20 years after Mary Kennedy hosted solo in Dublin back in 1995. However, in 1995 the contest consisted of only one show, whereas there were three shows (two semi-finals and a final) in 2013 which were all hosted by Mede by herself, although in the final was assisted by Eric Saade as green room host.

In 2015, Mede, along with Graham Norton, hosted the Eurovision's Greatest Hits EBU/BBC 60th anniversary concert show recorded on 31 March at the Eventim Apollo, in Hammersmith, London and was later broadcast in 27 countries.

In 2016, Mede was the co-host the first semi-final of the Swedish Melodifestivalen 2016 with Gina Dirawi at the Scandinavium in Gothenburg.

On 14 December 2015, SVT announced in a press conference that Mede and Måns Zelmerlöw would co-host the Eurovision Song Contest 2016. It was Mede's second time hosting the contest, joining Katie Boyle and Jacqueline Joubert as the only people to host the contest more than once.

Personal life
Mede is a polyglot, speaking Swedish, English, Spanish, Italian and French. Together with her former partner Mattias Günther, she has a daughter born in 2012. However, in 2015, it was confirmed that she and Günther had split.

Filmography

Television

Film
 (2014)

References

External links

Official website

Swedish television hosts
Swedish women comedians
Swedish women television presenters
21st-century Swedish comedians
1970 births
Living people
Entertainers from Stockholm
Stockholm University alumni